Governor Kent may refer to:

Edward Kent (1802–1877), 12th and 15th Governor of Maine
Joseph Kent (1779–1837), 19th Governor of Maryland